Michael Moebius Pirna (1968) is a contemporary artist and photographer.

Early life 
Born in communist East Germany, Moebius was forced to serve in the East German army. Having initially pursued a formal education and a career in engineering and construction, he later studied painting at the Dresden Academy of Fine Arts. 
Moebius moved to the US in 1998, after the fall of the Berlin Wall.

Influences 
Moebius has named Vargas, Warhol, Picasso, Caravaggio and Titian as artistic inspirations.

Commercial work 
Moebius' art has been featured in Playboy, Vogue, Vanity Fair and the Robb Report.

Notes 

1968 births
German artists
Living people